The turnip crinkle virus (TCV) core promoter hairpin (Pr) is an RNA element located in the 3' UTR of the viral genome that is required for minus strand RNA synthesis. The picture shown is not the TCV core promoter, but an upstream hairpin that is also required for replication of the virus.

See also 
 Turnip crinkle virus (TCV) repressor of minus strand synthesis H5

References

External links 
 

Cis-regulatory RNA elements
Tombusviridae